Aglaomorpha rigidula is a species of tropical fern in genus Aglaomorpha widely distributed throughout Southeast Asia, from Southwest China to Queensland and New South Wales in Australia. This fern develops two types of fronds, some of which near the base of the plant are shorter, sterile, and rust-colored which form a basket-like shape that trap moisture and organic components that nourish it. Especially in colder weather, this basket acts as prime habitat for animals such as the Amethystine python. 

The rhizomes of A. rigidula are sometimes used in traditional medicine as a folk remedy, and do have some antioxidant properties though valid medical application has yet to be found through pharmacological studies.

References

rigidula
Ferns of Australia
Ferns of Asia
Plants described in 1869